The Puppet Crown is a 1915 American drama silent film directed by George Melford and written by Harold MacGrath and William C. deMille. The film stars Ina Claire, Carlyle Blackwell, Chris Lynton, Cleo Ridgely, Horace B. Carpenter and John Abraham. The film was released on July 29, 1915, by Paramount Pictures.

Plot
The Puppet Crown was advertised as a film about a princess who lost her throne but gained a husband.

Cast 
Ina Claire as Princess Alexia
Carlyle Blackwell as Bob Carewe
Chris Lynton as King Leopold 
Cleo Ridgely as Duchess Sylvia
Horace B. Carpenter as Count Mallendorf 
John Abraham as Marshal Kampf
George Gebhardt as Colonel Beauvais
Tom Forman as Lieutenant Von Mitter
Marjorie Daw as Countess Elsa

Preservation status
 The film is now lost.

References

External links 
 
 

1915 films
1910s English-language films
Silent American drama films
1915 drama films
Lost American films
Paramount Pictures films
Films directed by George Melford
American black-and-white films
American silent feature films
Films set in Europe
Films based on American novels
1910s American films